Pir Mozd (also Romanized as Pīr Mozd) is a village in Razavar Rural District, in the Central District of Kermanshah County, Kermanshah Province, Iran. At the 2006 census, its population was 75, in 16 families.

References 

Populated places in Kermanshah County